Daniel Marius Onofraş (born 17 August 1980) is a Romanian former professional footballer and current team manager of first league club Politehnica Iași. He played for most of his career in the Romanian Liga I, mainly as a winger or a forward.

Career

Early years

Marius Onofraş started his career at hometown club Politehnica Iaşi, moving through the youth systems and making his debut in the senior squad in 1998.

Wanting to play in the Romanian Liga I, he moved to FC Brașov. Onofraş had a successful spell at FC Brașov playing also in the UEFA Europa League. In the summer of 2004 he rejoined his hometown club Politehnica Iaşi, now playing in the Romanian Liga I. With his good performances he helped them avoid relegation from the first tier of Romanian football.

Unirea Urziceni

Being spotted by Unirea Urziceni manager Dan Petrescu as a great talent he was bought alongside Politehnica Iaşi teammate Valeriu Bordeanu. He later signed a four and a half-year contract with the Urziceni team. He went on to win the 2008–09 Liga I and play in UEFA Champions League, where he scored a goal in a 4–1 win against Rangers.

Steaua București

In August 2010 he signed a contract with Steaua București alongside teammates from Unirea Urziceni: Galamaz, Ricardo, Marinescu, Apostol, Bilaşco and next week Brandán. On 11 May 2011, Onofraş scored his first goal for Steaua against ACF Gloria Bistrița in a Liga I home match, helping Steaua win with 3–1. In June 2011, Onofraş left Steaua.

In the summer of 2011 he joined Azerbaijan team Khazar Lankaran. In August, after only two matches, Onofraş left the team.

Politehnica Iași

In the same month he signed a two-year contract with his hometown club Politehnica Iași. On 3 September, Onofraş scored the winning goal against Gloria Buzău, in extra time, to bring all the points to Politehnica. In a game against Dunărea Galaţi he scored a goal only to help the team earn a draw.

Although there were talks that Onofraş will leave the team in the winter break, the player confirmed that he was committed to bringing the team to the first league.

On 28 April 2012, Onofraş scored the last two goals in the 4–2 victory against CS Otopeni. Politehnica turned the score around from 0–2 to stay in the fight for promotion. On 2 June, Onofraș captained his team to a 4–2 victory against Farul Constanța, and subsequent Liga II title and promotion to Liga I.

Career statistics

Club 
(Correct as of 1 June 2016)

Honours

Unirea Urziceni
Liga I: 2008–09

Steaua București
Romanian Cup: 2010–11

CSMS Iași
Liga II: 2011–12, 2013–14

Bradu Borca
Liga IV – Neamț County: 2019–20

References

External links

Living people
1980 births
Romanian footballers
FC Steaua București players
FC Steaua II București players
FC Unirea Urziceni players
FC Politehnica Iași (1945) players
FC Brașov (1936) players
FC Politehnica Iași (2010) players
AFC Dacia Unirea Brăila players
Liga I players
Liga II players
Association football forwards